Sinobrachyops placenticephalus is an extinct temnospondyl amphibian from Middle Jurassic-aged Shaximiao Formation in the Sichuan basin, China.  S. placenticephalus is one of the youngest known labyrinthodont amphibians.

See also
 Prehistoric amphibian
 List of prehistoric amphibians

References

Middle Jurassic amphibians
Prehistoric amphibians of Asia
Brachyopids
Fossil taxa described in 1985